Greene County Library may refer to:

Greene County Library, a branch of the Azalea Regional Library System
Springfield Greene County Library, in Springfield, Missouri